The Basketball Championship of Bosnia and Herzegovina  is the highest women's professional club basketball competition in Bosnia and Herzegovina. The League it was founded in 2002.

History
The Basketball League of Bosnia and Herzegovina has only existed since 2002. Until then there were three separate associations that each organized their own separate competitions.

Current teams

Champions
 Official list confirmed by FIBA for all Bosnia and Herzegovina

Champions of regional leagues
 Official list confirmed by FIBA for national regional leagues before 2002

League of KSBiH

League of Republika Srpska

League of Herzeg-Bosnia

List of champions
 Including titles in SFR Yugoslavia and Bosnia and Herzegovina

References

External links
 Official website
 Profile at eurobasket.com

Bosnia and Herzegovina
Basketball leagues in Bosnia and Herzegovina
Sports leagues established in 2002
League
2002 establishments in Bosnia and Herzegovina